Eton College is a public school in Eton, Berkshire, England. It was founded in 1440 by Henry VI under the name Kynge's College of Our Ladye of Eton besyde Windesore, making it the 18th-oldest school in the Headmasters' and Headmistresses' Conference (HMC). Originally intended as a sister institution to King's College, Cambridge, Eton is particularly well-known for its history, wealth, and notable alumni (Old Etonians).

Eton is one of only three public schools—along with Harrow (1572) and Radley (1847)—to have retained the boys-only, boarding-only tradition, which means that its boys live at the school seven days a week. The remainder (such as Rugby in 1976, Charterhouse in 1971, Westminster in 1973, and Shrewsbury in 2015) have since become co-educational or, in the case of Winchester,  are undergoing the transition to that status. Eton has educated prime ministers, world leaders, Nobel laureates, Academy Award and BAFTA award-winning actors, and generations of the aristocracy, having been referred to as "the nurse of England's statesmen".

The school is the largest boarding school in England ahead of Millfield and Oundle. Eton charges up to £46,296 per year (£15,432 per term, with three terms per academic year, for 2022/23). Eton was noted as being the sixth most expensive HMC boarding school in the UK in 2013–14; however, the school admits some boys with modest parental income: in 2011 it was reported that around 250 boys received "significant" financial help from the school, with the figure rising to 263 pupils in 2014, receiving the equivalent of around 60% of school fee assistance, whilst a further 63 received their education free of charge. Eton has also announced plans to increase the figure to around 320 pupils, with 70 educated free of charge, with the intention that the number of pupils receiving financial assistance from the school continues to increase.

History 

Eton College was founded by King Henry VI as a charity school to provide free education to 70 poor boys who would then go on to King's College, Cambridge, founded by the same King in 1441. Henry took Winchester College as his model, visiting on many occasions, borrowing its statutes and removing its headmaster and some of the scholars to start his new school.

When Henry VI founded the school, he granted it a large number of endowments, including much valuable land. The group of feoffees appointed by the king to receive forfeited lands of the Alien Priories for the endowment of Eton were as follows:
 Henry Chichele, Archbishop of Canterbury (d. 1443)
 Thomas Spofford, Bishop of Hereford (d. 1456)
 John Low, Bishop of Rochester (d. 1467)
 William Ayscough, Bishop of Salisbury (d. 1450) 
 William de la Pole, 1st Marquess of Suffolk (1396–1450) (later Duke of Suffolk)
 John Somerset (d. 1454), Chancellor of the Exchequer and the king's doctor
 Thomas Beckington (c. 1390–1465), Archdeacon of Buckingham, the king's secretary and later Keeper of the Privy Seal
 Richard Andrew (d. 1477), first Warden of All Souls College, Oxford, later the king's secretary
 Adam Moleyns (d. 1450), Clerk of the Council
 John Hampton (d. 1472) of Kinver, Staffordshire, an Esquire of the Body
 James Fiennes, another member of the Royal Household
 William Tresham, another member of the Royal Household

It was intended to have formidable buildings (Henry intended the nave of the College Chapel to be the longest in Europe) and several religious relics, supposedly including a part of the True Cross and the Crown of Thorns. He persuaded the then Pope, Eugene IV, to grant him a privilege unparalleled anywhere in England: the right to grant indulgences to penitents on the Feast of the Assumption. The college also came into possession of one of England's Apocalypse manuscripts.

However, when Henry was deposed by King Edward IV in 1461, the new King annulled all grants to the school and removed most of its assets and treasures to St George's Chapel, Windsor, on the other side of the River Thames. Legend has it that Edward's mistress, Jane Shore, intervened on the school's behalf. She was able to save a good part of the school, although the royal bequest and the number of staff were much reduced.

Construction of the chapel, originally intended to be slightly over twice as long, with 18, or possibly 17, bays (there are eight today) was stopped when Henry VI was deposed. Only the Quire of the intended building was completed. Eton's first Headmaster, William Waynflete, founder of Magdalen College, Oxford and previously Head Master of Winchester College, built the ante-chapel that completed the chapel. The important wall paintings in the chapel and the brick north range of the present School Yard also date from the 1480s; the lower storeys of the cloister, including College Hall, were built between 1441 and 1460.

As the school suffered reduced income while still under construction, the completion and further development of the school has since depended to some extent on wealthy benefactors. Building resumed when Roger Lupton was Provost, around 1517. His name is borne by the big gatehouse in the west range of the cloisters, fronting School Yard, perhaps the most famous image of the school. This range includes the important interiors of the Parlour, Election Hall, and Election Chamber, where most of the 18th century "leaving portraits" are kept.

"After Lupton's time, nothing important was built until about 1670, when Provost Allestree gave a range to close the west side of School Yard between Lower School and Chapel". This was remodelled later and completed in 1694 by Matthew Bankes, Master Carpenter of the Royal Works. The last important addition to the central college buildings was the College Library, in the south range of the cloister, 1725–29, by Thomas Rowland. It has a very important collection of books and manuscripts.

19th century onwards 
The Duke of Wellington is often incorrectly quoted as saying that "The Battle of Waterloo was won on the playing-fields of Eton." Wellington was at Eton from 1781 to 1784 and was to send his sons there. According to Nevill (citing the historian Sir Edward Creasy), what Wellington said, while passing an Eton cricket match many decades later, was, "There grows the stuff that won Waterloo", a remark Nevill construes as a reference to "the manly character induced by games and sport" among English youth generally, not a comment about Eton specifically. In 1889, Sir William Fraser conflated this uncorroborated remark with the one attributed to him by Count Charles de Montalembert's C'est ici qu'a été gagné la bataille de Waterloo ("It is here that the Battle of Waterloo was won").

The architect John Shaw Jr (1803–1870) became surveyor to Eton. He designed New Buildings (1844–46), Provost Francis Hodgson's addition to providing better accommodation for collegers, who until then had mostly lived in Long Chamber, a long first-floor room where conditions were inhumane.

Following complaints about the finances, buildings and management of Eton, the Clarendon Commission was set up in 1861 as a royal commission to investigate the state of nine schools in England, including Eton.
Questioned by the commission in 1862, headmaster Edward Balston came under attack for his view that in the classroom little time could be spared for subjects other than classical studies.

As with other public schools, a scheme was devised towards the end of the 19th century to familiarise privileged schoolboys with social conditions in deprived areas. The project of establishing an "Eton Mission" in the crowded district of Hackney Wick in east London was started at the beginning of 1880, and it lasted until 1971 when it was decided that a more local project (at Dorney) would be more realistic. However over the years much money was raised for the Eton Mission, a fine church by G. F. Bodley was erected; many Etonians visited and stimulated among other things the Eton Manor Boys' Club, a notable rowing club which has survived the Mission itself, and the 59 Club for motorcyclists.

The very large and ornate School Hall and School Library (by L. K. Hall) were erected in 1906–08 across the road from Upper School as the school's memorial to the Etonians who had died in the Boer War. Many tablets in the cloisters and chapel commemorate the large number of dead Etonians of the First World War. A bomb destroyed part of Upper School in World War II and blew out many windows in the chapel. The college commissioned replacements by Evie Hone (1949–52) and by John Piper and Patrick Reyntiens (1959 onward).

Among headmasters of the 20th century were Cyril Alington, Robert Birley and Anthony Chenevix-Trench. M. R. James was a provost.

In 1959, the college constructed a nuclear bunker to house the college's provost and fellows. The facility is now used for storage.

In 1969 Dillibe Onyeama became the first black person to obtain his school-leaving certificate from Eton. Three years later Onyeama was banned from visiting Eton after he published a book which described the racism that he experienced during his time at the school. Simon Henderson, current headmaster of Eton, apologised to Onyeama for the treatment he endured during his time at the school, although Onyeama did not think the apology was necessary.

In 2005, the school was one of fifty of the country's leading independent schools found to have breached the Competition Act 1998 (see Eton College controversies).

In 2011, plans to attack Eton College were found on the body of a senior al-Qaeda leader shot dead in Somalia.

Coat of arms 

The coat of arms of Eton College was granted in 1449 by the founder King Henry VI, as recorded as follows on the original charter, attested by the Great Seal of England and preserved in the College archives:
On a field sable three lily-flowers argent, intending that Our newly-founded College, lasting for ages to come, whose perpetuity We wish to be signified by the stability of the sable colour, shall bring forth the brightest flowers redolent of every kind of knowledge; to which also, that We may impart something of royal nobility which may declare the work truly royal and illustrious, We have resolved that that portion of the arms which by royal right belong to Us in the Kingdoms of France and England be placed on the chief of the shield, per pale azure with a flower of the French, and gules with a leopard passant or.

Thus the blazon is: Sable, three lily-flowers argent on a chief per pale azure and gules in the dexter a fleur-de-lys in the sinister a lion passant guardant or. Although the charter specifies that the lily-flowers relate to the founder's hope for a flourishing of knowledge, that flower is also a symbol for the Virgin Mary, in whose honour the college was founded, with the number of three having significance to the Blessed Trinity. The motto of the college is Floreat Etona ("may Eton flourish"). The grant of arms to King's College, Cambridge, is worded identically, but with roses instead of lily-flowers.

Overview 

The school is headed by a provost, a vice-provost and a board of governors (known as fellows) who appoint the headmaster.

Governance and management
 the school governors include:

 William Waldegrave, Baron Waldegrave of North Hill  (Provost)
 Peter Mckee (Vice Provost)
 Professor Michael Proctor  
 The Duchess of Wellington  
 Lady Moore of Etchingham 
 Mark Esiri 
 The Rt Hon Lord Leggatt 
 Sir Mark Lyall Grant  
 Baroness Morrissey  
 Simon Vivian  
 Professor  (2022) 
 Professor Ewan Birney 

Statute VII of the College provides that the board shall be populated as follows

 The Provost of King's College, Cambridge
 One Fellow to be elected by the Provost & Fellows, who is or has been a member of a faculty of, or a fellow of a college at the University of Oxford
 One Fellow to be elected by the Provost & Fellows, who is or has been a member of a faculty of, or a fellow of a college at the University of Cambridge
 One Fellow to be nominated by the Council of the Royal Society following identification by the Provost & Fellows or a suitable candidate from amongst the Fellowship of the Royal Society 
 One Fellow to be nominated by the Lord Chief Justice of England and Wales
 One Fellow to be elected by the Head Master, Lower Master, and Assistant Masters 
 Four members to be elected by the Provost and Fellows themselves

The school contains 25 boys' houses, each headed by a housemaster, selected from the more senior members of the teaching staff, which numbers some 155. Almost all of the school's pupils go on to universities, about a third of them to University of Oxford or University of Cambridge.

The headmaster is a member of the Headmasters' and Headmistresses' Conference and the school is a member of the Eton Group of independent schools in the United Kingdom.
The school appointed its first female Lower Master (deputy head), Susan Wijeratna, in 2017.

Eton has a long list of distinguished former pupils. In 2019, Boris Johnson became the 20th British prime minister to have attended the school, and the fifth since the end of the Second World War. Previous Conservative leader David Cameron was the 19th British prime minister to have attended the school, and recommended that Eton set up a school in the state sector to help drive up standards.

Fame 
Eton has been described as the most famous public school in the world, and has been referred to as "the chief nurse of England's statesmen".

Eton has educated generations of British and foreign aristocracy, and for the first time, members of the British royal family in direct line of succession: the Prince of Wales and his brother the Duke of Sussex, in contrast to the royal tradition of male education at either naval college or Gordonstoun, or by tutors.

The Good Schools Guide called the school "the number one boys' public school", adding that "The teaching and facilities are second to none." The school is a member of the G30 Schools Group.

Eton today is a larger school than it has been for much of its history. In 1678, there were 207 boys. In the late 18th century, there were about 300, while today, the total has risen to over 1,300.

Financial support 
About 20% of pupils at Eton receive financial support, through a range of bursaries and scholarships. A recent Head Master, Tony Little, said that Eton was developing plans to allow any boy to attend the school whatever his parents' income and, in 2011, said that around 250 boys received "significant" financial help from the school. In early 2014, this figure had risen to 263 pupils receiving the equivalent of around 60% of school fee assistance, whilst a further 63 received their education free of charge. Little said that, in the short term, he wanted to ensure that around 320 pupils per year receive bursaries and that 70 were educated free of charge, with the intention that the number of pupils receiving financial assistance would continue to increase.

Changes to the school 
Registration at birth, corporal punishment, and fagging are no longer practised at Eton. Academic standards were raised, and by the mid-1990s Eton ranked among Britain's top three schools in getting its pupils into Oxford and Cambridge.

The proportion of boys at the school who were sons of Old Etonians fell from 60% in 1960 to 20% in 2016. This has been attributed to a number of factors, including the dissolution of the house lists, which allowed Old Etonians to register their sons at birth, in 1990, harder entrance examinations as the emphasis on academic attainment increased, a sharp rise in school fees increasingly beyond the means of many UK families, and increased applications from international, often very wealthy, families.

School terms 

There are three academic terms (known as halves) in the year:
 The Michaelmas Half, from early September to mid-December. New boys are now admitted only at the start of the Michaelmas Half, unless in exceptional circumstances.
 The Lent Half, from mid-January to late March.
 The Summer Half, from late April to late June or early July.

They are called halves because the school year was once split into two halves, between which the boys went home.

Boys' houses

King's Scholars 

One boarding house, College, is reserved for 70 King's Scholars, who attend Eton on scholarships provided by the original foundation and awarded by examination each year; King's Scholars pay up to 90 per cent of full fees, depending on their means. Of the other pupils, up to a third receive some kind of bursary or scholarship. The name 'King's Scholars' refers to the foundation of the school by King Henry VI in 1440. The original school consisted of the 70 Scholars (together with some Commensals) and the Scholars were educated and boarded at the foundation's expense.

King's Scholars are entitled to use the letters 'KS' after their name and they can be identified by a black gown worn over the top of their tailcoats, giving them the nickname 'tugs' (Latin: togati, wearers of gowns); and occasionally by a surplice in Chapel. The house is looked after by the Master in College. Having succeeded in the examination, they include many of the most academically gifted boys in the school.

Oppidans 
As the school grew, more students were allowed to attend provided that they paid their own fees and lived in boarding-houses within the town of Eton, outside the college's original buildings. These students became known as Oppidans, from the Latin word oppidum, meaning "town". The houses developed over time as a means of providing residence for the Oppidans in a more congenial manner, and during the 18th and 19th centuries the housemasters started to rely more for administrative purposes on a senior female member of staff, known as a "dame", who became responsible for the physical welfare of the boys. (Some houses had previously been run by dames without a housemaster.) Each house typically contains about 50 boys. Although classes are organised on a school basis, most boys spend a large proportion of their time in their house.

Not all boys who pass the college election examination choose to become King's Scholars, which involves living in "College" with its own ancient traditions, wearing a gown, and therefore a degree of separation from the other boys. If they choose instead to belong to one of the 24 Oppidan houses, they are known as Oppidan Scholars. Oppidan scholarships may also be awarded for consistently performing with distinction in school and external examinations. To gain an Oppidan Scholarship, a boy must have either three distinctions in a row or four throughout his career. Within the school, an Oppidan Scholar is entitled to use the post-nominal letters OS.

Each Oppidan house is usually referred to by the initials (forenames and surname) of its current housemaster, a senior teacher ("beak"), or more formally by his surname alone, not by the name of the building in which it is situated. Houses occasionally swap buildings according to the seniority of the housemaster and the physical desirability of the building. The names of buildings occupied by houses are used for few purposes other than a correspondence address. They are: Godolphin House, Jourdelay's (both built as such c. 1720), Hawtrey House, Durnford House (the first two built as such by the Provost and Fellows, 1845, when the school was increasing in numbers and needed more centralised control), The Hopgarden, South Lawn, Waynflete, Evans's, Keate House, Warre House, Villiers House, Common Lane House, Penn House, Walpole House, Cotton Hall, Wotton House, Holland House, Mustians, Angelo's, Manor House, Farrer House, Baldwin's Bec, The Timbralls, and Westbury.

House structure 

In addition to the house master, each house has a house captain and a house captain of games. Some houses have more than one. House prefects were once elected from the oldest year, but this no longer happens. The old term "Library" survives in the name of the room set aside for the oldest year's use, where boys have their own kitchen. Similarly, boys in their penultimate year have a room known as "Debate".

There are entire house gatherings every evening, usually around 8:05–8:30 p.m. These are known as "Prayers", due to their original nature. The house master and boys have an opportunity to make announcements, and sometimes the boys provide light entertainment.

For much of Eton's history, junior boys had to act as "fags", or servants, to older boys. Their duties included cleaning, cooking, and running errands. A Library member was entitled to yell at any time and without notice, "Boy, Up!" or "Boy, Queue!", and all first-year boys had to come running. The last boy to arrive was given the task. These practices, known as fagging, were partially phased out of most houses in the 1970s. Captains of house and games still sometimes give tasks to first-year boys, such as collecting the mail from the school office.

There are many inter-house competitions, mostly in sports.

Head Masters: 1442–present

Uniform 

The School is known for its traditions, including a uniform of black tailcoat (or morning coat) and black waistcoat, a starched stiff collar and black pinstriped trousers. Most pupils wear a white "tie" which is a narrow strip of cloth folded over the joint of the collar to hide the collar stud, but some senior boys are entitled to wear a white bow tie and winged collar ("Stick-Ups"). There are some variations in the school dress worn by boys in authority, see School Prefects and King's Scholars sections.

The long-standing belief that the present uniform was first worn as mourning for the death of King George III in 1820 is unfounded. In 1862 headmaster Edward Balston, in an interview with the Clarendon Commission, noted little in the way of uniform.

Lord Clarendon: One more question, which bears in some degree upon other schools, namely with regard to the dress. The boys do not wear any particular dress at Eton?
Edward Balston: No, with the exception that they are obliged to wear a white neckcloth.

Lord Clarendon: Is the colour of their clothes much restricted?

Edward Balston: We would not let them wear for instance a yellow coat or any other colour very much out of the way.

Lord Clarendon: If they do not adopt anything very extravagant either with respect to colour or cut you allow them to follow their own taste with respect to the choice of their clothes?

Edward Balston: Yes.

Lord Lyttelton: They must wear the common round hat?
Edward Balston: Yes.

The uniform worn today was gradually adopted and standardised towards the end of the nineteenth century. Until 1967, boys under the height of  wore a cropped jacket (known as an Eton jacket, mess jacket, or "bum-freezer") instead of a tailcoat.

Tutors and teaching 
Teachers are known unofficially as "beaks". The pupil to teacher ratio is 8:1, which is extremely low by typical UK school standards. Class sizes start at around twenty to twenty-five in the first year and are often below ten by the final year.

The original curriculum concentrated on prayers, Latin and devotion, and "as late as 1530 no Greek was taught".

Later the emphasis was on classical studies, dominated by Latin and Ancient History, and, for boys with sufficient ability, Classical Greek. From the latter part of the 19th century this curriculum has changed and broadened: for example, there are now more than 100 students of Chinese, which is a non-curriculum course. In the 1970s, there was just one school computer, in a small room attached to the science buildings. It used punched tape to store programs. Today, all boys must have laptop computers, and the school fibre-optic network connects all classrooms and all boys' bedrooms to the internet.

The primary responsibility for a boy's studies lies with his House Master, but he is assisted by an additional director of studies, known as a tutor. Classes, formally known as "divisions" ("divs"), are organised on a School basis; the classrooms are separate from the houses. New blocks of classrooms have appeared every decade or so since New Schools, designed by Henry Woodyer and built 1861–63. Despite the introduction of modern technology, the external appearance and locations of many of the classrooms have remained unchanged for a long time. The oldest classroom still in use, "Lower School", dates from the 15th century.

Every evening, about an hour and a quarter, known as Quiet Hour, is set aside, during which boys are expected to study or prepare work for their teachers if not otherwise engaged. Some Houses, at the discretion of the House Master, may observe a second Quiet Hour after prayers in the evening. This is less formal, with boys being allowed to visit each other's rooms to socialise if neither boy has work outstanding.

The Independent Schools Inspectorate's report for 2016 says, "The achievement of pupils is exceptional. Progress and abilities of all pupils are at a high level. Pupils are highly successful in public examinations, and the record of entrance to universities with demanding entry requirements in the United Kingdom and overseas is strong."

In 2017, a science, technology, engineering, and mathematics (STEM) schools skills ranking table, designed to show employability, showed the school performed disproportionally badly, falling to 109th place and behind many state schools. Edwina Dunn, the chairwoman of the company producing the report, called for schools to be reassessed based on how suitable pupils are for businesses in the post-Brexit world.

School magazines 
The Chronicle is the official school magazine, having been founded in 1863. It is edited by boys at the school. Although liable to censorship, it has a tradition of satirising and attacking school policies, as well as documenting recent events. The Oppidan, founded in 1828, was published once a half; it covered all sport in Eton and some professional events as well, but no longer exists. The Junior Chronicle is the official school magazine of Lower Boys (pupils in their first two years at Eton) and it written, edited and designed solely by them.

Other school magazines, including The Academic Yearbook, The Arts Review, and The Eton Zeitgeist have been published, as well as publications produced by individual departments such as The 1440 Review (history), The Axiom (mathematics), Scientific Etonian (science), The Ampersand (English), Biopsy (Medicine) and The Lexicon (modern languages).

Societies 
At Eton, there are many organisations known as 'societies', in many of which pupils come together to discuss a particular topic or to listen to a lecture, presided over by a senior pupil, and often including a guest speaker. At any one time there are about fifty societies and clubs in existence, catering for a wide range of interests and largely run by boys.

Societies tend to come and go, depending on the special enthusiasms of the masters and boys in the school at the time, but some have been in existence for many years. Those in existence at present include: Aeronautical, African, Alexander Cozens (Art), Amnesty, Archeological, Architectural, Astronomy, Balfour, Banks (conservation), Caledonian, Cheese, Classical, Comedy, Cosmopolitan, Debating, Design, Entrepreneurship, Francophone, Geographical, Geopolitical, Global, Henry Fielding, Hispanic, History, Keynes (economics), Law, Literary, Mathematical, Medical, Middle Eastern, Model United Nations, Modern Languages, Oriental, Orwell (left-wing), Simeon (Christian), Parry (music), Photographic, Political, Praed (poetry), Rock (music), Rous (equestrian), Salisbury (formerly diplomatic, now colonial history), Savile (Rare Books and Manuscripts), Shelley, Scientific, Sports, Tech Club, Theatre, Wellington (military), Wine and Wotton's (philosophy).

Among past guest speakers are Rowan Atkinson, Jeremy Burge, Ralph Fiennes, King Constantine II of Greece, Kit Hesketh-Harvey, Anthony Horowitz, John Major, Boris Johnson, Ian McKellen, J. K. Rowling, Katie Price, Kevin Warwick, Andrew Lloyd Webber, Vivienne Westwood, Terry Wogan and Alan Yau.

Grants and prizes 
Prizes are awarded on the results of trials (internal exams), GCSE and AS-levels. In addition, many subjects and activities have specially endowed prizes, several of which are awarded by visiting experts. The most prestigious is the Newcastle Scholarship, awarded on the strength of an examination, consisting of two papers in philosophical theology, moral theory and applied ethics. The second most prestigious is the Rosebery Prize for History – this is awarded on the same day as the Newcastle Scholarship, and follows a similar format of a 3-hour exam during the Lent Half (although the Newcastle Scholarship is awarded on the basis of two such examinations). Also of note is the Gladstone Memorial Prize and the Coutts Prize, awarded on the results of trials and AS-level examinations in C block (Year 12); and the Huxley Prize, awarded for a project on a scientific subject. Other specialist prizes include the Newcastle Classical Prize, which was formerly the same prize as the Newcastle Scholarship, but the two were separated as a decreasing number of philosophers were fluent in Latin and Classical Greek;  the Queen's Prizes for French and German; the Duke of Newcastle's Russian Prize; the Beddington Spanish Prize; the Strafford and Bowman Shakespeare Prizes; the Tomline and Russell Prizes in Mathematics; the Sotheby Prize for History of Art; the Waddington Prize for Theology and Philosophy; the Birley Prize for History; the Rorie Mackenzie Prize for Modern Languages; the Robert Boyle Prize for Physics. The Lower Boy Rosebery Prize; the Wilder Prize for Theology and The Hervey Verse Prize for poetry in senior years. Prizes are awarded too for excellence in such activities as painting, sculpture, ceramics, playing musical instruments, musical composition, declamation, silverwork, and design.

Various benefactions make it possible to give grants each year to boys who wish, for educational or cultural reasons, to work or travel abroad. These include the Busk Fund, which supports individual ventures that show particular initiative; the C. M. Wells Memorial Trust Fund, for the promotion of visits to classical lands; the Sadler Fund, which supports, among others, those intending to enter the Foreign Service; and the Marsden Fund, for travel in countries where the principal language is not English.

Incentives and sanctions 
Eton has a well-established system for encouraging boys to produce high-standard work. An excellent piece of work may be rewarded with a "Show Up", to be shown to the boy's tutors as evidence of progress. If, in any particular term, a pupil makes a particularly good effort in any subject, he may be "Commended for Good Effort" to the Head Master (or Lower Master).

If any boy produces an outstanding piece of work, it may be "Sent Up For Good", storing the effort in the College Archives for posterity. This award has been around since the 18th century. As Sending Up For Good is fairly infrequent, the process is rather mysterious to many of Eton's boys. First, the master wishing to Send Up For Good must gain the permission of the relevant Head of Department. Upon receiving his or her approval, the piece of work will be marked with Sent Up For Good and the student will receive a card to be signed by House Master, tutor and division master.

The opposite of a Show Up is a "Rip". This is for sub-standard work, which is sometimes torn at the top of the page/sheet and must be submitted to the boy's housemaster for signature. Boys who accumulate rips are liable to be given a "White Ticket", a form of a progress report which must be signed at intervals by all his teachers and may be accompanied by other punishments, usually involving doing domestic chores or writing lines. In recent times, a milder form of the rip, 'sign for information', colloquially known as an "info", has been introduced, which must also be signed by the boy's housemaster and tutor.

Internal examinations are held at the end of the Michaelmas half (i.e. autumn term) for all pupils, and in the Summer half for those in the first, second and fourth years (i.e. those not taking a full set of public examinations). These internal examinations are called "Trials".

A boy who is late for any division or other appointments may be required to sign "Tardy Book", a register kept in the School Office, between 7:35 am and 7:45 am, every morning for the duration of his sentence (typically three days). Tardy Book may also be issued for late work. For more serious misdeeds, a boy is placed "on the Bill", which involves him being summoned by the sudden entry of a prefect into one of his divisions, who announces in a loud and formal tone that at a given time a certain pupil must attend the office of the Head Master, or Lower Master if the boy is in the lower two years, to talk personally about his misdeeds. The most serious misdeeds may result in expulsion, or rustication (suspension) or in former times, beating. Conversely, should a master be more than 15 minutes late for a class, traditionally the pupils may claim it as a "run" and absent themselves for the rest of its duration, provided they report their intention so to do at the school office.

A traditional punishment took the form of being made to copy, by hand, Latin hexameters. Offenders were frequently set 100 hexameters by Library members, or, for more serious offences, Georgics (more than 500 hexameters) by their House Masters or the Head Master. The giving of a Georgic is now extremely rare, but still occasionally occurs.

Corporal punishment 
Eton used to be renowned for its use of corporal punishment, generally known as "beating". In the 16th century, Friday was set aside as "flogging day". A special wooden birching block was used for the purpose, with the boy being directed to fetch it and then kneel over it.

John Keate, Head Master from 1809 to 1834, took over at a time when discipline was poor. Until 1964, offending boys could be summoned to the Head Master or the Lower Master, as appropriate, to receive a birching on the bare posterior, in a semi-public ceremony held in the Library, where there was a special wooden birching block over which the offender was held.  Anthony Chenevix-Trench, Head Master from 1964 to 1970, abolished the birch and replaced it with caning, also applied to the bare buttocks, which he administered privately in his office. Chenevix-Trench also abolished corporal punishment administered by senior boys. Previously, House Captains were permitted to cane offenders over the seat of the trousers. This was a routine occurrence, carried out privately with the boy bending over with his head under the edge of a table. Less common but more severe were the canings administered by Pop (see Eton Society below) in the form of a "Pop-Tanning", in which a large number of hard strokes were inflicted by the President of Pop in the presence of all Pop members (or, in earlier times, each member of Pop took it in turns to inflict a stroke). The culprit was summoned to appear in a pair of old trousers, as the caning would cut the cloth to shreds. This was the most severe form of physical punishment at Eton.

Chenevix-Trench's successor from 1970, Michael McCrum, retained private corporal punishment by masters but ended the practice of requiring boys to take their trousers and underpants down when bending over to be caned by the Head Master. By the mid-1970s, the only people allowed to administer caning were the Head Master and the Lower Master.

Corporal punishment was phased out in the 1980s. The film director Sebastian Doggart claims to have been the last boy caned at Eton, in 1984.

Prefects 
In addition to the masters, the following three categories of senior boys are entitled to exercise School discipline. Boys who belong to any of these categories, in addition to a limited number of other boy office holders, are entitled to wear winged collars with bow ties.
 Pop: officially known as 'Eton Society', a society comprising the most popular, well-regarded, confident and able senior boys. It is a driving ambition of many capable Eton schoolboys to be elected to Pop, and many high-performers who are refused entry to this society consider their careers at Eton a failure. Boris Johnson was a member of Pop, whilst David Cameron (unlike his elder brother Alexander) failed to be elected, which possibly fed their later political rivalry. Over the years its power and privileges have grown. Pop is the oldest self-electing society at Eton. The rules were altered in 1987 and again in 2005 so that the new intake are not elected solely by the existing year and a committee of masters. Members of Pop wear white and black houndstooth-checked trousers, a starched stick-up collar and white bow-tie, and are entitled to wear flamboyant waistcoats, often of their own design. Historically, only members of Pop were entitled to furl their umbrellas or sit on the wall on the Long Walk, in front of the main building. However, these traditions have died out. They perform roles at many of the routine events of the school year, including school plays, parents' evenings and other official events, and generally maintain order. Notable ex-members of Pop include the Prince of Wales (unlike his younger brother the Duke of Sussex, who failed to be elected), Eddie Redmayne, and Tom Hiddleston.
 Sixth Form Select: an academically selected prefectorial group consisting, by custom, of the 10 senior King's Scholars and the 10 senior Oppidan Scholars. Members of Sixth Form Select are entitled to wear silver buttons on their waistcoats. They also act as Praepostors: they enter classrooms in mid-lesson without knocking and ask in a loud and formal tone, "Is (family name) in this division?" followed by "He is to see the Head Master at (time) on the bill" (the Bill, see above). Members of Sixth Form Select also perform "Speeches", a formal event held five times a year.
 House Captains: The captains of each of the 25 boys' houses (see above). There are usually either one or two per house. They have little responsibility at a school level, but  within their house are more senior than Pop or Sixth Form Select members. House Captains are entitled to wear a mottled-grey waistcoat.

It is possible to belong to Pop and Sixth Form Select at the same time. It is less common for a House Captain to belong to Pop but it still happens fairly often.

In the era of Queen Elizabeth I there were two praepostors in every form, who noted down the names of absentees. Until the late 19th century, there was a praepostor for every division of the school.

Sport 
Sport is a feature of Eton; which has nearly 200 acres of playing fields and amenity land. The names of the playing fields include Agar's Plough, Dutchman's, Upper Club, Lower Club, Sixpenny/The Field, and Mesopotamia (situated between two streams and often shortened to "Mespots").
 During the Michaelmas Half, the sport curriculum is dominated by football (called Association) and rugby union, with some rowing for a smaller number of boys.
 During the Lent Half it is dominated by the field game, a code of football, but this is unique to Eton and cannot be played against other schools. However, using strategies from the field game, the Eton football team (Old Etonians F.C.) reached the finals of the FA Cup 6 times, winning twice in 1879 and 1882. During this half, Collegers also play the Eton wall game; this game received national publicity when it was taken up by Prince Harry.  Aided by AstroTurf facilities on Masters' field, field hockey has become a major Lent Half sport along with Rugby 7's.  Elite rowers prepare for the Schools' Head of the River Race in late March.
 During the Summer Half, sporting boys divide into dry bobs, who play cricket, tennis or athletics, and wet bobs, who row on the River Thames and the rowing lake in preparation for The National Schools Regatta and the Princess Elizabeth Challenge Cup at Henley Royal Regatta.

The rowing lake at Dorney was developed and is owned by the college.   It was the venue for the rowing and canoeing events at the 2012 Summer Olympics and the World Junior Rowing Championships.

The annual cricket match against Harrow at Lord's Cricket Ground is the oldest fixture of the cricketing calendar, having been played there since 1805. A staple of the London society calendar since the 1800s, in 1914, its importance was such that over 38,000 people attended the two days' play, and in 1910 the match made national headlines but interest has since declined considerably, and the match is now a one-day limited overs contest.

In 1815, Eton College documented its football rules, the first football code to be written down anywhere in the world.

There is a running track at the Thames Valley Athletics Centre and an annual steeplechase. The bursar claimed that Windsor, Slough and Eton Athletic club was "deprived" because it did not have a world-class running track and facilities for training and the Sports Council agreed, saying the whole community would benefit. However Steve Osborn, director of the Safe Neighbourhoods Unit, described the decision as "staggering" given substantial reduction in youth services by councils across the country. The facility which became the Thames Valley Athletics Centre opened in April 1999.

Among the other sports played at Eton is Eton Fives.

Olympic rowing 
In 2006, six years before the 2012 London Summer Olympics and London 2012 Summer Paralympic Games, Eton completed the construction of Dorney Lake, a permanent, eight-lane, 2,200 metre course (about 1.4 miles) in a 400-acre park. Eton financed the construction from its own funds. Officially known throughout the Games as Eton Dorney, Dorney Lake provided training facilities for Olympic and Paralympic competitors, and during the Games, hosted the Olympic and Paralympic Rowing competitions as well as the Olympic Canoe Sprint event. It attracted over 400,000 visitors during the Games period (around 30,000 per day), and was voted the best 2012 Olympic venue by spectators. Thirty medal events were held on Dorney Lake, during which Team GB won a total of 12 medals, making the lake one of the most successful venues for Team GB. The FISA President, Denis Oswald, described it as "the best-ever Olympic rowing venue". In June 2013, it hosted the World Rowing Cup. Access to the parkland around the Lake is provided to members of the public, free of charge, almost all the year round.

Music and drama

Music 
The current "Precentor" (Head of Music) is Tim Johnson, and the School has eight organs and an entire building for music (performance spaces include the School Hall, the Farrer Theatre and two halls dedicated to music, the Parry Hall and the Concert Hall). Many instruments are taught, including obscure ones such as the didgeridoo. The School participates in many national competitions; many pupils are part of the National Youth Orchestra, and the School gives scholarships for dedicated and talented musicians. A former Precentor of the college, Ralph Allwood set up and organised Eton Choral Courses, which run at the School every summer.

In 2009, the School's musical protégés came to wider notice when featured in a TV documentary A Boy Called Alex. The film followed an Etonian, Alex Stobbs, a musician with cystic fibrosis, as he worked toward conducting the difficult Magnificat by Johann Sebastian Bach.

Drama 

Numerous plays are put on every year at Eton College; there is one main theatre, called the Farrer (seating 400) and 2 Studio theatres, called the Caccia Studio and Empty Space (seating 90 and 80 respectively). There are about 8 or 9 house productions each year, around 3 or 4 "independent" plays (not confined solely to one house, produced, directed and funded by Etonians) and three school plays, one specifically for boys in the first two years, and two open to all years. The school plays have such good reputations that they are normally fully booked every night. Productions also take place in varying locations around the School, varying from the sports fields to more historic buildings such as Upper School and College Chapel.

In recent years, the School has put on a musical version of The Bacchae (October 2009) as well as productions of A Funny Thing Happened on the Way to the Forum (May 2010), The Cherry Orchard (February 2011), Joseph K (October 2011), Cyrano de Bergerac (May 2012), Macbeth (October 2012), London Assurance (May 2013), Jerusalem (October 2013), A Midsummer Night's Dream (May 2014), Antigone (October 2015), The Government Inspector (May 2016) and Romeo and Juliet (May 2017). On top of this, every three years, the School holds a fringe-style School Play Festival, where students and teachers write, direct and act in their own plays, hosted over the period of a week. The most recent one was held in October 2016, which hosted a wide variety of plays, from a double bill of two half an hour plays, to a serialised radio drama, written by a boy in F block (the youngest year.)

Often girls from surrounding schools, such as St George's, Ascot, St Mary's School Ascot, Windsor Girls' School and Heathfield St Mary's School, are cast in female roles. Boys from the School are also responsible for the lighting, sound and stage management of all the productions, under the guidance of several professional full-time theatre staff.

Every year, Eton employs a 'Director-in-Residence', an external professional director on a one-year contract who normally directs one house play and the Lower Boy play (a school play open solely to the first two-year groups), as well as teaching Drama and Theatre Studies to most year groups.

The drama department is headed by Scott Handy (taking over from Hailz Osbourne in 2015) and several other teachers; Simon Dormandy was on the staff until late 2012. The School offers GCSE drama as well as A-level "English with Theatre Studies".

Celebrations 
Eton's best-known holiday takes place on the so-called "Fourth of June", a celebration of the birthday of King George III, Eton's greatest patron. This day is celebrated with the Procession of Boats, in which the top rowing crews from the top four years row past in vintage wooden rowing boats. Similar to the Queen's Official Birthday, the "Fourth of June" is no longer celebrated on 4 June, but on the Wednesday before the first weekend of June. Eton also observes St. Andrew's Day, on which the Eton wall game is played.

Charitable status and fees 
Until 18 December 2010, Eton College was an exempt charity under English law (Charities Act 1993, Schedule 2). Under the provisions of the Charities Act 2006, it is now an excepted charity, and fully registered with the Charities Commission, and is now one of the 100 largest charities in the UK. As a charity, it benefits from substantial tax breaks. It was calculated by David Jewell, former Master of Haileybury, that in 1992 such tax breaks saved the school about £1,945 per pupil per year, although he had no direct connection with the school. This subsidy has declined since the 2001 abolition by the Labour Government of state-funded scholarships (formerly known as "assisted places") to independent schools. However, no child attended Eton on this scheme, meaning that the actual level of state assistance to the school has always been lower. Eton's former Head Master, Tony Little, has claimed that the benefits that Eton provides to the local community free of charge (use of its facilities, etc.) have a higher value than the tax breaks it receives as a result of its charitable status. The fee for the academic year 2021–2022 was £44,094 (approximately US$60,000 or €52,000 as of November 2021), although the sum is considerably lower for those pupils on bursaries and scholarships.

Support for state education

London Academy of Excellence 
Eton co-sponsors a state sixth-form college, the London Academy of Excellence, opened in 2012 in the London Borough of Newham in East London, the second most deprived borough in England, and just over a mile from the Queen Elizabeth Olympic Park, the main venue for London's 2012 Summer Olympics. In 2015–2016, it had around 440 pupils and 32 teachers. The college is free of charge and aims to get all its students into higher education. The college's close relationship with Eton has led it to be described as 'the Eton of the East End'. In 2015, the college reported that it had been named best sixth form in the country by The Sunday Times.

Holyport College 
In September 2014, Eton opened, and became the sole educational sponsor for, Holyport College, a new purpose-built co-educational state boarding and day school that provides free education for around 500 pupils. It is located in Holyport, near Maidenhead in Berkshire. Construction costs were around £15 million, in which a fifth of places for day pupils have been set aside for children from poor homes, 21 boarding places for to youngsters on the verge of being taken into care, and a further 28 boarders funded or part-funded through bursaries.

State school pupils 
The above-described developments are running alongside long-established courses that Eton has provided for pupils from state schools, most of them in the summer holidays (July and August).

Universities Summer School 
Launched in 1982, the Universities Summer School is an intensive residential course open to boys and girls throughout the UK who attend state schools, are at the end of their first year in the Sixth Form, and are about to begin their final year of schooling.

Brent-Eton Summer School 
Launched in 1994, the Brent-Eton Summer School offers 40–50 young people from the London Borough of Brent, an area of inner-city deprivation, an intensive one-week residential course, free of charge, designed to help bridge the gap between GCSE and A-level.

Eton, Slough, Windsor and Heston Independent and State School Partnership 
In 2008, Eton helped found the Eton, Slough, Windsor and Heston Independent and State School Partnership (ISSP), with six local state schools. The ISSP's aims are 'to raise pupil achievement, improve pupil self-esteem, raise pupil aspirations and improve professional practice across the schools'. Eton also runs a number of choral and English language courses during the summer months.

Historical relations with other schools 
Eton College has links with some private schools in India today, maintained from the days of the British Raj, such as The Doon School and Mayo College. Eton College is also a member of the G30 Schools Group, a collection of college preparatory boarding schools from around the world, including Turkey's Robert College, the United States' Phillips Academy and Phillips Exeter Academy, Australia's Melbourne Grammar School and Launceston Church Grammar School, Singapore's Raffles Institution, and Switzerland's International School of Geneva.

Eton has fostered a relationship with the Roxbury Latin School, a traditional all-boys private school in Boston, USA. Former Eton headmaster and provost Sir Eric Anderson shares a close friendship with Roxbury Latin Headmaster emeritus F. Washington Jarvis; Anderson has visited Roxbury Latin on numerous occasions, while Jarvis briefly taught theology at Eton after retiring from his headmaster post at Roxbury Latin. The headmasters' close friendship spawned the Hennessy Scholarship, an annual prize established in 2005 and awarded to a graduating RL senior for a year of study at Eton. Hennessy Scholars generally reside in Wotton house.

Eton College funded the Chapel of Trinity College in Kandy, Sri Lanka. In 1927 with underground construction proving to be expensive, the project was strapped for funds. The administration led by Principal Rev John McLeod Campbell appealed far and wide for funds. The captivating edifice finished eight years later is the fruit of the generosity of many colleges in the UK including Eton College. In appreciation of the contributions, the coat of arms of Eton College adorns the inner pillars of the Trinity College Chapel, Kandy
 
Bishop James Chapman, a former alumnus of Eton College, would go on to become the 1st Anglican Bishop of the Diocese of Colombo. He was instrumental in establishing two prominent schools in Sri Lanka: S. Thomas' College, Mount Lavinia, a fee-levying Anglican selective entry boys' private school based on the Etonian model in 1851, and Bishop's College, Colombo, a private girls' school in 1875.

The Doon School, India 
The Doon School, founded in 1935, is an all-boys' public school in India that was modelled along the lines of Eton and Winchester.  The School's first headmaster was an Englishman, Arthur E. Foot, who had spent nine years as a science master at Eton College before joining Doon. In Doon's early years, teachers from Eton travelled to India to fill the academic posts. Peter Lawrence was one of the first few masters to go to Doon. This led to similar slang being introduced in Doon which is still in use today, such as trials, dame, fagging, and schools (as opposed to 'periods'). In February 2013, Eton's headmaster Tony Little visited Doon to hold talks with the then headmaster of Doon, Peter McLaughlin, on further collaboration between the two schools. Both schools participate in an exchange programme in which boys from either school visit the other for one academic term. Doon has often been described as the 'Eton of India' by media outlets such as The New York Times, BBC, Channel 4, The Guardian, The Daily Telegraph, and Forbes, but the school eschews the label.

Old Etonians 

Former pupils of Eton College are known as Old Etonians.

Politics 

Eton has produced twenty British prime ministers. Eleven of them are shown above.

Royalty and nobility 
A number of blue-blooded pupils come to Eton from aristocratic and royal families from six continents, some of whom have been sending their sons to Eton for generations.

British:

 The Prince of Wales (born 1982)
 Prince Harry, Duke of Sussex (born 1984)
 Hugh Grosvenor, 2nd Duke of Westminster (1879–1953)
 Prince Henry, Duke of Gloucester (1900–1974)
 Prince Richard, Duke of Gloucester (born 1944)
 Alexander Windsor, Earl of Ulster (born 1974)
 Prince William of Gloucester (1941–1972)
 Prince Edward, Duke of Kent (born 1935)
 George Windsor, Earl of St Andrews (born 1962)
 Edward Windsor, Lord Downpatrick (born 1988)
 Prince Michael of Kent (born 1942)
 Lord Frederick Windsor (born 1979)
 James Ogilvy (born 1964), son of Princess Alexandra and the Hon. Sir Angus Ogilvy
 George Lascelles, 7th Earl of Harewood (1923–2011), the son of Mary, Princess Royal and Countess of Harewood
 Charles Spencer, 9th Earl Spencer (born 1964), brother of Diana, Princess of Wales
 Charles Armstrong-Jones, Viscount Linley (born 1999)
 John Spencer-Churchill, 11th Duke of Marlborough (1926–2014)
 Lord William Beauchamp Nevill (1860–1939)

Foreign:

 King Prajadhipok or Rama VII of Siam (1893–1941)
 Prince Tokugawa Iesato (1863–1940)
 King Leopold III of Belgium (1901–1983)
 Prince Nirajan Bir Bikram Shah Dev of Nepal (1978–2001)
 Aga Khan III (1877–1957)
 King Birendra of Nepal (1945–2001) 
 King Dipendra of Nepal (1971–2001)
 Crown Prince Zera Yacob Amha Selassie of Ethiopia
 Prince Nicholas of Romania (1903–1978)
 Prince Eustachy Sapieha (1881-1963)
 Alexander, Crown Prince of Yugoslavia (born 1945)

Writers

Scientists

Journalists

Actors 

Actor Dominic West has been unenthusiastic about the career benefits of being an Old Etonian, saying it "is a stigma that is slightly above 'paedophile' in the media in a gallery of infamy", but asked whether he would consider sending his own children there, said "Yes, I would. It's an extraordinary place. ... It has the facilities and the excellence of teaching and it will find what you’re good at and nurture it".

Music

Others 
Charles Edward, Duke of Saxe-Coburg and Gotha, Nazi SA Obergruppenführer
Francis Bertie, 1st Viscount Bertie of Thame, ambassador
Henry Blofeld, cricket commentator
Beau Brummell, dandy
Guy Burgess, diplomat and spy
Julian Byng, 1st Viscount Byng of Vimy, WWI commander and Governor-General of Canada
Alan Clark, Member of Parliament and author
James Colthurst, radiologist and friend of Diana, Princess of Wales
Charles Douglas-Home, father of Prime Minister Sir Alec Douglas-Home
Ranulph Fiennes, explorer
Alexander Fiske-Harrison, bullfighter and author
Ivo Graham, comedian
Bear Grylls, adventurer
William Inge, Dean of St Paul's Cathedral
John Maynard Keynes, economist
Richard Layard, economist
Oliver Leese, WWII commander 8th Army
Frederick Stanley Maude, WWI commander
Stewart Menzies, WWII head of MI6.
Alexander Nix, CEO of Cambridge Analytica.
Nigel Oakes, CEO of Behavioural Dynamics Institute and SCL Group.
Lawrence Oates, Antarctic explorer
Derek Parfit, philosopher
Herbert Plumer, 1st Viscount Plumer, WWI commander
Paul Raison, art historian and a Chairman of Christie's
Timothy Raison, MP and Government minister
Henry Rawlinson, 1st Baron Rawlinson, WWI commander, ultimately Commander in Chief India
C.T. Studd, cricketer and missionary
Justin Welby, Archbishop of Canterbury
Henry Maitland Wilson, World War II commander

Thirty-seven Old Etonians have been awarded the Victoria Cross—the largest number to alumni of any school (see List of Victoria Crosses by school).

Partially filmed at Eton 
Here follows a list of films partially filmed at Eton.
 Henry VIII and His Six Wives (1972)
 Aces High (1976)
 Chariots of Fire (1981)
 Young Sherlock Holmes (1985)
 The Fourth Protocol (1987)
 Inspector Morse: Absolute Conviction (1992 TV episode)
 Lovejoy: "Friends in High Places" (1992 TV episode)
 The Secret Garden (1993)
 The Madness of King George (1994)
 A Dance to the Music of Time (1997 TV mini-series)
 Shakespeare in Love (1998)
 Mansfield Park (1999)
 A History of Britain (2000 TV series documentary)
 The Social Network (2010)
 My Week With Marilyn (2011)
 The English Game (2020 TV miniseries)

Controversies

See also 

 Eton and Castle, the electoral ward that includes the College
 Eton Boating Song
 Eton College Collections
 Eton mess
 Eton Montem
 Eton Racing Boats
 "The Eton Rifles", a 1979 song by the Jam
 Eton Summer Course
 List of head masters of Eton College
 List of the oldest schools in the world

Notes

References 

 Nevill, Ralph (1911). Floreat Etona: Anecdotes and Memories of Eton College. London: Macmillan. .
 McConnell, J.D.R. (1967). Eton: How It Works. London: Faber and Faber. .

 Term Dates [accessed 19 August 2021]

Further reading 
 Card, Tim, Eton Established: A History from 1440 to 1860 (London, John Murray, 2001)
 Cust, Lionel, A History of Eton College, third edition, London, 1899, 
 
 Fraser, Nick, The Importance of Being Eton (London, Short Books, June 2006)
 
 
 Osborne, Richard, Music and Musicians of Eton: 1440 to the present (London, Cygnet Press, 2012)
 Parker, Eric, Playing Fields: School Days at Eton (London, Philip Allan, 1922)

External links 

 
 Independent Schools Inspectorate – Eton College
 Mohamad at Eton – documentary about Palestinian refugee attending Eton 

 
1440 establishments in England
Boarding schools in Berkshire
Boys' schools in Berkshire
Charities based in Berkshire
Church of England private schools in the Diocese of Oxford
Educational institutions established in the 15th century
Exempt charities
Grade I listed buildings in Berkshire
Grade I listed educational buildings
Private schools in the Royal Borough of Windsor and Maidenhead
Member schools of the Headmasters' and Headmistresses' Conference
Racquets venues
Schools with a royal charter
Eton, Berkshire
Schools cricket